Lyudmila Leonidovna Dmitriadi (born 24 September 1969) is an Uzbekistani sprinter who specialized in the 100 metres. She competed in the women's 100 metres at the 1996 Summer Olympics.

Her personal best time is 11.44 seconds, achieved in June 2001 in Bishkek.

Achievements

References
 

1969 births
Living people
Uzbekistani female sprinters
Athletes (track and field) at the 1996 Summer Olympics
Athletes (track and field) at the 2000 Summer Olympics
Olympic athletes of Uzbekistan
Asian Games medalists in athletics (track and field)
Athletes (track and field) at the 1998 Asian Games
Athletes (track and field) at the 2002 Asian Games
Asian Games silver medalists for Uzbekistan
Asian Games bronze medalists for Uzbekistan
Medalists at the 1998 Asian Games
Medalists at the 2002 Asian Games
Olympic female sprinters
20th-century Uzbekistani women
21st-century Uzbekistani women